John Graham Kettley (born 11 July 1952 in Halifax, West Yorkshire) is an English freelance weather forecaster.

Early life
He was educated at Todmorden Grammar School, he played cricket for Burnley and Todmorden. A geography teacher at his school sparked his interest in weather forecasting. He started Geography A-level, but never took the exam. 

He worked at the meteorological office at Manchester Airport for two years from 1970 before studying applied health and social care at what is now Coventry University, where he met his wife. He spent four years researching meteorology. He trained for a year in weather presentation at the Met Office College, Shinfield near Reading.

Career
From 1980, he worked at the Nottingham Weather Centre, presenting his first forecast for Radio Lincolnshire, then further forecasts for the BBC's Midlands Today (in the Nottingham news opt-out, starting 28 May 1980) and Central Television. In 1985, he became a national forecaster on the BBC. On Thursday 18 April 1991 he launched the first international weather forecast on the new BBC World Service Television.

Radio
Kettley used to work for the Met Office, and has previously presented weather for BBC Radio Five Live. Since October 2019, he has presented the weather forecasts during weekday breakfast on national rolling news radio station LBC News. On Tuesday 1 December 1998, he appeared on Radio Shuttleworth on Radio 4.

Travel programmes
He was a presenter on The Travel Show programme, from Thursday 18 June 1987, with Penny Junor, John Thirlwell and Matthew Collins. In May 1997, Kettley presented the Out and About walking programme.

Commercial weather forecasting
In 2000, Kettley left the Met Office to join commercial weather company British Weather Services, and continues to provide forecasts across a range of media outlets and sporting concerns including the Football Association, Twickenham and racecourses such as Newbury, Cheltenham, Haydock Park and Newmarket

Personal life
Kettley enjoys playing cricket, fell-walking and horse racing. A supporter of Burnley F.C., he often makes references to the team's performances during broadcasts. He married Lynn in September 1990 in North Lincolnshire. His parents lived in Littleborough.

He lived in north Hertfordshire in the late 1980s with his wife Elizabeth, who he had married in 1981. from Lancashire. In 1988 he played cricket (as a bowler) for Ardeley in East Hertfordshire, where he lived.

He married graphic designer Lynn Grundy at St Andrew's church in Kirton in Lindsey on 12 September 1990, with the service given by Rev Ian Walker. Kettley had known Grundy at his polytechnic, although she went later to the University of Leicester, and designed Ladybird Books in the mid-1980s; his wife had attended Brigg High School for Girls. They had their second son in September 1994; their first was in September 1992.

Immortalised in verse
Kettley's status was confirmed in 1988, when a band called A Tribe of Toffs released the song "John Kettley Is a Weatherman", which also made reference to other TV weather presenters of the day, including Michael Fish, Bernard Davey, Bill Giles, Ian McCaskill and Wincey Willis. The single reached number 21 in the UK Singles Chart. The song included the chorus:

John Kettley is a weatherman
A weatherman, a weatherman
John Kettley is a weatherman
And so is Michael Fish
And so is Billy Giles
And so is Ian McCaskill
And so is Wincey Willis

References

Publications
 Rain Stopped Play: The Geography of Cricket (co-author)  April 2002
 Weatherman  September 2009

External links
 
 Kettley's official website
 Bio at BBC Weather Centre
 Bio at British Weather Services
 
 John Kettley Interview at Best British TV
John Kettley from 3 October 1996 https://www.youtube.com/watch?v=43RGQecEZKg

News items
 Halifax Courier article October 2007
 Lancashire Evening Telegraph article January 2005
 His memories of cricket in July 2000
 Lancashire Evening Telegraph article April 1998
  International Association of Broadcast Meteorology

1952 births
Living people
Alumni of Coventry University
BBC weather forecasters
British television presenters
English meteorologists
People from East Hertfordshire District
People from Halifax, West Yorkshire